The Sun (Solntse) is a 2005 Russian biographical film directed by Alexander Sokurov, depicting Japanese Emperor Shōwa (Hirohito) during the final days of World War II. It is the third film in a trilogy by director Aleksandr Sokurov that includes Taurus about the Soviet Union's Vladimir Lenin and Moloch about Nazi Germany's Adolf Hitler. It received generally positive reviews from critics.

Plot
Towards the conclusion of the Second World War, Japan nears defeat as Emperor Hirohito (Issey Ogata) reminisces about the final war years. He is depicted as still surrounded by his attentive staff who look after his every bodily need. When Hirohito receives a report from his collected military and civilian staff of imminent defeat, he appears detached and starts reciting oddly disconnected verse about Japan's geography written by his historical predecessors. He has an interest in marine biology, and his staff keep him entertained with new specimens being delivered to his library even in the last days and hours prior to American troops arriving on his doorstep. Finally, with the Americans imminently approaching, he is then set up in a bunker underneath his Imperial Palace in Tokyo. Hirohito reflects on the foundation of the conflict while attempting to dictate peace terms.

Later, U.S. military commander General Douglas MacArthur (Robert Dawson) is sent to bring him through the ruins of Tokyo for a meeting regarding the occupation of the victorious Allied leaders. The two very different men strangely bond after sharing dinner and cigars, after which Hirohito retreats to his personal quarters. Following his admission of personal failures, Hirohito attempts to rebuild his war-ravaged country as a fully developed constitutional nation while his own future remains in doubt, as either the Emperor of Japan or a war criminal.

Cast
Issey Ogata as Emperor Hirohito
Robert Dawson as General Douglas MacArthur
Kaori Momoi as Empress Kōjun
Shiro Sano as the Chamberlain
Shinmei Tsuji as the Old Servant
Taijiro Tamura as the Scientist
Georgi Pitskhelauri as McArthur's Warrant Officer
Hiroya Morita as Kantarō Suzuki
Toshiaki Nishizawa as Mitsumasa Yonai
Naomasa Musaka as Korechika Anami
Yusuke Tozawa as Kōichi Kido
Kōjirō Kusanagi as Shigenori Tōgō
Tetsuro Tsuno as Yoshijirō Umezu
Rokuro Abe as Soemu Toyoda
Jun Haichi as Nobuyuki Abe

Production

Filming
Having confessed himself in "not being interested in the history or politics which took place, and not really being interested in historical events of the period", Sokurov gives a personal impression of Hirohito while omitting all references to questions surrounding the Tokyo tribunal regarding the personal responsibility of the emperor as head of the Imperial General Headquarters in relation to Japanese war crimes. That omission results in  the imperial conference between the emperor and his council and his meeting with MacArthur, in fact, contain none of the words actually related to imperial interpreter Katsuzō Okumura's transcript. For example, as noted by Okumura, MacArthur praised the emperor's "august virtue" (miitsu).

According to The Times, the film has not been widely screened in Japan because of fears of violence from right wing extremists over its portrayal of Hirohito.

Reception

Critical response
The Sun has an approval rating of 93% on review aggregator website Rotten Tomatoes, based on 42 reviews, and an average rating of 8.10/10. The website's critical consensus states, "Certainly not for the impatient, Aleksandr Sokurov's deliberately paced look at Hirohito in the waning days of World War II is both enlightening and admirable in its restraint". It also has a score of 85 out of 100 on Metacritic, based on 12 critics, indicating "universal acclaim".

Awards
At the 2005 Russian Guild of Film Critics Awards the film was awarded the prizes for Best Film, Best Director (Alexander Sokurov) and Best Music (Andrei Sigle).

The Sun won the Golden Apricot at the 2005 Yerevan International Film Festival, Armenia, for Best Feature Film.

References

External links
 
 The Sun at Rotten Tomatoes
 The Dream Director film review by Daniel Mendelsohn from The New York Review of Books

2005 films
2000s biographical films
Films directed by Alexander Sokurov
Films set in Japan
Pacific War films
Cultural depictions of Hirohito
Cultural depictions of Douglas MacArthur
Japan in non-Japanese culture
French World War II films
Italian World War II films
Russian World War II films
Russian historical drama films
Swiss World War II films
2000s French films
Films set in bunkers